Rust in Peace is the fourth studio album by American thrash metal band Megadeth, released on September 24, 1990, by Capitol Records. It was the first Megadeth album to feature lead guitarist Marty Friedman and drummer Nick Menza. The songs "Hangar 18" and "Holy Wars... The Punishment Due" were released as singles. A remixed and remastered version of the album featuring four bonus tracks was released in 2004.

Since its release, Rust in Peace has often been named as one of the best thrash metal records of all time, by publications such as Decibel and Kerrang!, and listed in the reference book 1001 Albums You Must Hear Before You Die. The album was nominated for a Grammy Award for Best Metal Performance at the 33rd Grammy Awards. At the 1991 Foundations Forum, the album received a Concrete Foundations Award for "Top Radio Album" and the single "Hangar 18" won "Top Radio Cut" award.

Background and production
In 1988, Megadeth appeared at the Monsters of Rock festival at Donington Park in the UK, alongside Iron Maiden, Kiss, Helloween, Guns N' Roses, and David Lee Roth. The band performed to an audience of more than 100,000 people and was soon added to the "Monsters of Rock" European tour, but dropped out after the first show due to bassist David Ellefson's drug problems. Further issues within the band caused frontman and guitarist Dave Mustaine to fire drummer Chuck Behler and guitarist Jeff Young, and canceled their scheduled 1988 Australian tour. Nick Menza, previously Behler's drum tech, was hired as the band's new drummer. The search for a new guitarist was a drawn out process; Mustaine examined a number of guitarists for the job, including Dimebag Darrell of Pantera and Jeff Waters of Annihilator, and the former was initially offered the job before declining. Mustaine had asked original Megadeth guitarist Chris Poland to rejoin the band, with Poland tracking lead guitar parts on a few demos. According to Poland he was "99 percent going to join" the band but was talked out of it by his manager. According to Mustaine, one of the last guitarists he had heard about, Marty Friedman, had sent him a copy of Dragon's Kiss, on which Friedman played. Upon listening to the record, Mustaine had Friedman come in to audition and hired him. This would become the band's first stable line-up and, as recognized by fans, the 'classic' Megadeth lineup.

The album title Rust in Peace was inspired by a bumper sticker that Mustaine saw on the back of a vehicle while driving home from Lake Elsinore, California. The sticker read: "May all your nuclear weapons rust in peace". Mustaine liked the concept and decided to use it as a title for Megadeth's upcoming album. Rust in Peace was recorded at Rumbo Recorders with producer Mike Clink, while the mixing was handled by Max Norman. Clink was brought in for his work on both Guns N' Roses' Appetite for Destruction and UFO's Strangers in the Night. The producer's work dealt mostly with the bass, drums and Friedman's guitar. In a 2002 interview, Mustaine declared that they "really didn't make the record with [Clink]" as at the time he was focused on Guns N' Roses' Use Your Illusion I and II – which were also being recorded at Rumbo – and stated most of the work in the album was done by himself, Norman, and engineer Micajah Ryan.

The album artwork was created by artist Ed Repka, who previously had done the cover for Peace Sells... but Who's Buying? in 1986. It references "Hangar 18", and depicts band mascot Vic Rattlehead and world leaders of the era viewing an alien body. In addition to creating the album's cover, Repka also supplied artwork for the album's two singles. The object Rattlehead is holding was confirmed by Mustaine to be a material resembling Kryptonite.

The men featured on the cover are, from left to right: an unidentified British representative, Japanese Prime Minister Toshiki Kaifu, German President Richard von Weizsäcker, Soviet President Mikhail Gorbachev, and United States President George H. W. Bush.

Composition
The album features multiple lyrical themes: religion, politics and warfare, as well as Mustaine's personal issues, such as his fight against drug and alcohol addiction, UFO conspiracy theories and even the Marvel Comics character Punisher.

The opening song, "Holy Wars... The Punishment Due" finds its thematic inspiration derived from the Northern Ireland conflict, in which the largely Catholic nationalist community were in conflict with the mainly Protestant loyalist community over the sovereignty of the six counties of Northern Ireland. Mustaine has said that at a show in Antrim, Northern Ireland, he discovered bootlegged Megadeth T-shirts were on sale. He was dissuaded from taking action to have them removed on the basis that they were part of fund raising activities for "The Cause", explained as something to bring equality to Catholics and Protestants in the region. Liking how "The Cause" sounded as was explained to him, Mustaine dedicated a performance of "Anarchy in the U.K." to it, causing the audience to riot. The band were forced to travel in a bulletproof bus after the show. This incident, along with Marvel's Punisher, inspired Mustaine to write the song.

"Rust in Peace... Polaris", addresses the topic of nuclear warfare, with "Polaris" referring to the Cold War-era Lockheed UGM-27 Polaris intercontinental ballistic missile. Mustaine has revealed that the song, originally titled "Child Saint", was one of his earlier compositions, having been written before his tenure with Metallica (1982–83). Menza proposed the concept for "Hangar 18", a song about UFO conspiracies and Area 51. Musically, the song features twin guitar solos after the verse.

Release and reception

Rust in Peace was released on September 24, 1990, by Capitol Records. In 1994, the album was certified platinum by the Recording Industry Association of America (RIAA) for shipping one million copies in the United States. Rust in Peace, along with the rest of Megadeth's Capitol-released studio albums, was remixed and remastered in 2004.

Upon release, the album received widespread critical acclaim. Greg Kot of the Chicago Tribune called it Megadeth's most accomplished album, praising its "instrumental virtuosity, thoughtful lyricism and punkish rage".

Robert Palmer of Rolling Stone wrote that the album is demonstration of how far the "nasty speed thrash" concept can go without being "formulaic and boring". Reviewing the album for Entertainment Weekly, Jim Farber described the music as "sheer velocity, combined with dexterity" and Mustaine's lyrics as "nihilistic whimsy". Mike Stagno from Sputnikmusic agreed that the songwriting was "top notch" on the album, as well as the fast and technical musicianship. He also spoke highly of Friedman's and Mustaine's guitar performance, calling them "one of the most potent duos in the scene".

Spin reviewer Tom Nordlie praised the album, deeming it a "mature, complex, surprisingly consonant and sparely produced album", and concluded that Rust in Peace "never sleeps". Music journalist Kim Cooper also noted the album's maturity and wrote that Rust in Peace "transcended the hard rock genre and raised the bar to a whole new level". Another positive reaction came from Rock Hard, whose writer Holger Stratmann stated that the record was "pure Megadeth", filled with "razor sharp guitars" and "snotty vocals".

Legacy and influence
In retrospective analysis, Rust in Peace has been cited as having a large impact on its genre. Heavy metal magazine Decibel labeled the album as a "genre-defining work", while Kerrang! wrote that the record "set a new standard for heavy metal in the 90s". IGN named Rust in Peace the fourth most influential heavy metal album of all time, commenting that the album "displays Dave Mustaine's finest writing ever". Additionally, Martin Popoff ranked it eleventh among the best heavy metal albums of all time. In a reader poll organized by MusicRadar in 2010, Rust in Peace was voted as the sixth best metal album ever. The MusicRadar staff explained that the record saw Megadeth moving "into the big league", while staying true to their intricate sound and lyricism. In a list compiled by Chad Bowar of About.com, Rust in Peace was placed as the best heavy metal album of the 1990s and named a "thrash masterpiece". The album was nominated for Best Metal Performance at the 33rd Grammy Awards. The album was also included in the book 1001 Albums You Must Hear Before You Die.

The tracks "Holy Wars... The Punishment Due" and "Hangar 18" have become staples of Megadeth's live set, and are fan favorites. The guitar solo on "Tornado of Souls" is considered to be one of the greatest solos in heavy metal music. In 2010, the band announced a 22-show North American tour to celebrate the 20th anniversary of Rust in Peace. The band performed the entire album at every show. Dates in South and Central America were later added to the tour, due to positive response from fans. In 2010, Shout! Factory released a live recording filmed on the Hollywood Palladium stop of the tour, entitled Rust in Peace Live. It was released on September 7, 2010, in Blu-ray, CD and DVD formats, and debuted at number 161 on the Billboard 200 and number two on the Billboard DVD charts.

Rust in Peace in its entirety was released as purchasable downloadable content in the rhythm game Rock Band, a part of their "Rust in Peace Download Package". It was released a little more than a year after the release of Peace Sells...But Who's Buying? on the game's download store. A cover version of "Holy Wars" by Steve Ouimette was featured in Rock Revolution. "Holy Wars" was also featured in Guitar Hero: Warriors of Rock, while "Hangar 18" was featured in Guitar Hero II and as downloadable content for Guitar Hero 5. Both songs have been described as amongst the most difficult songs in the series' history. "Holy Wars", "Hangar 18" and "Tornado of Souls" were also released as downloadable content for Rocksmith 2014

A sequel to "Hangar 18" titled "Return to Hangar" later featured on Megadeth's ninth studio album, The World Needs a Hero.

Track listing
All songs written and composed by Dave Mustaine, except where noted.

Personnel 
Credits are adapted from the album's liner notes.

Charts

Certifications

Accolades

Appearances
"Hangar 18" appeared in the 2006 video game Guitar Hero II.
"Tornado of Souls" appeared in the 2009 video game Brütal Legend.
The whole album was featured as DLC for the Rock Band video game series on February 9, 2010.

References

Bibliography

External links

1990 albums
Albums produced by Mike Clink
Albums with cover art by Ed Repka
Capitol Records albums
Megadeth albums